Dial may refer to:

Mechanical device
Rotary dial, a device for the input of number(s) in telephones and similar devices
Dialling, usually means to make a telephone call by turning the rotary dial or pressing the buttons
Dial (measurement), a display device in radio, measuring instruments, etc.
Mode dial, part of dSLR and SLR-like digital cameras

DIAL
 DIAL, an acronym for differential absorption LIDAR
 DIAL, an acronym for Discovery and Launch, a network protocol
 DIAL, an acronym for Digital Impact Alliance
Dunedin International Airport Limited, New Zealand
Delhi International Airport (P) Limited, Delhi, India

Other
Dial (surname), people named Dial
Dial Corporation, a consumer products company that is a wholly owned subsidiary of Henkel AG & Co. KGaA.
Dial (soap), a brand of antibacterial soap and related products
Dial, West Virginia, a community in the United States
Dial (band), a Dutch progressive rock band
Dial Press, a publishing house founded in 1923 by Lincoln MacVeagh
The Dial, an American magazine published intermittently from 1840 to 1929
Dial H for Hero, a comic book feature published by DC Comics
-dial, the suffix for dialdehydes (a molecule with two aldehyde groups)
'dial.' can be an abbreviation for 'dialect'

See also
Dial House (disambiguation), various
Dial Records (disambiguation), various
 A sundial or clock face
Diol, a chemical containing two hydroxyl groups